Teluk Batik is a main beach in Manjung District, Perak, Malaysia.

It was discovered in the Sixties and rapidly underwent changes to accommodate the large numbers of holidaymakers who warm the beach during weekends.

External links

Manjung District
Populated places in Perak